Franklin García Fermín (San Francisco de Macorís, 17 January 1957) is a Dominican jurist and professor from the Universidad Autónoma de Santo Domingo, and its Rector for 2008-2011 period.

Biography
He was born in San Francisco de Macorís. His grandfather was General Santo García, well-known patriot and former Civil Governor of Santiago de los Caballeros. His father, Marco Tulio García, was a judge and public prosecutor for more than 35 years.

In 1976, entry to the UASD to the law school. He has graduate degrees in Civil Rights and Political Science as well a diploma in International Relations and Diplomacy.

He began his career as a teaching in 1984 as professor deputy and a year later became a professor of the law school. In 1987 he was elected president of the Juridical and Politics Sciences Faculty Assembly, and in 1992 president of the Colegio de Abogados de la República Dominicana.

In 2001 he received the title of Investigator of the Universidad del País Vasco, and in 2003 that of Doctor.

On 22 February 2008 he was elected Rector of UASD.

He currently serves as the Minister of Higher Education for the Dominican Republic.

Honours and awards
 Amín Abel Hasbún Student Award (Student merit award from UASD) Dominican Republic
 Andrés Bello Order, first class (Venezuela)
 Fray Antón de Montesino Juridical Merit National Grand Prize
 Guest Professor of the Paris University. France.
 Teach of the Universidad Nacional San Antonio Abad del Cusco

Author
García Fermín has written a number of books:

 Introducción al Estudio del Derecho (coauthor with Dr. Rosalía Sosa Pérez) (c1996)
 Evaluación del Poder Judicial y Propuesta para su Transformación
 Introducción al Derecho Privado
 Código del Menor y Recopilación de leyes que lo amplían y lo modifica
 Los Procesos Penales en Estados Unidos.

External links
Franklin García Fermín´s web page
Listín Diario

1957 births
Living people
People from San Francisco de Macorís
University of the Basque Country alumni
Dominican Republic political scientists
White Dominicans